= Journal of Pharmaceutical and Biomedical Analysis =

- Discipline: Pharmacology
- Language: English

Publication details
- Publisher: Elsevier
- Impact factor: 3.571 (2021)

Standard abbreviations
- ISO 4: J. Pharm. Biomed. Anal.

Links
- Journal homepage; Online archive

Journal of Pharmaceutical and Biomedical Analysis is a peer-reviewed medical journal that covers the interdisciplinary aspects of analysis in the pharmaceutical, biomedical and clinical sciences. The journal is published by Elsevier.

== Abstracting and indexing ==
The journal is abstracted and indexed in:

- Analytical Abstracts
- Research Alert
- Current Contents - Life Sciences
- Current Contents - Social & Behavioral Sciences
- Current Contents
- Elsevier BIOBASE

According to the Journal Citation Reports, the journal has a 2021 impact factor of 3.571.
